Michael Mealor (born February 29, 1992) is an American actor and model. He is known for his role as Kyle Abbott on the CBS daytime soap opera The Young and the Restless (2018–present). Previously, he was a former model for Abercrombie and Fitch. Originally from Atlanta, Georgia, he moved to Los Angeles to pursue a career in acting. He joined the main cast of The Young and the Restless in 2018 and departed in 2021. In 2022, it was announced that Mealor will return to reprise his role as Kyle on a long-term contract.

Career

The Young and the Restless 

Mealor joined the CBS Daytime Drama The Young and the Restless in 2018 for the role of Kyle Abbott, the prodigal son of Jack Abbott (Peter Bergman) in celebration of the Soap's 45th anniversary. He joined his co-star Hunter King whom plays Summer Newman as her character's love interest. In 2021, Mealor confirmed his exit from Y&R and only made brief appearances on the show. In 2022, it was announced, that Mealor will return to reprise his role as Kyle following the return of Y&R veteran Susan Walters who plays Diane Jenkins (Kyle's mom).

Filmography

Television

Films

References

External links
 
 https://www.cbs.com/shows/the_young_and_the_restless/cast/215869/

Living people
1992 births
American actors